Julius Schmidt or Schmid may refer to:

 Julius Schmidt (aviator) (died 1944), German World War I flying ace
 Johann Friedrich Julius Schmidt (1825–1884), known as Julius Schmidt, German astronomer
 Julius Schmidt (artist), American artist
 Julius Schmid (manufacturer) (1865–1955), creator of the Sheik and Ramses condoms
 Julius Schmid (painter) (1854–1935), Austrian painter